The 2017 Cooper Tires USF2000 Championship Powered by Mazda will be the eighth season – since its revival in 2010 – of the U.S. F2000 National Championship, an open wheel auto racing series that is the first step in INDYCAR's Road to Indy ladder, operated by Andersen Promotions. A 14-race schedule was announced on September 14, 2016.

The 2017 season will see the introduction of the Tatuus USF-17 car for the Championship class. SCCA Formula Continental chassis (including the previous Van Diemen\Elan DP08) were slated to compete in National Class, but after the first weekend there were no race entries in that class and it was abandoned.

2016 Mazda Road to Indy Shootout champion Oliver Askew of Cape Motorsports came out strong, winning five of the first six races. However, he faltered at the Road America round and Dutch driver Rinus Veekay won both races there, opening the door to a tighter championship fight. Askew won two more races down the stretch while Veekay won only one more, the final race at Watkins Glen International, where Askew finished second, good enough to claim the championship. Canadian Parker Thompson won three races in the second half of the season and finished third in points. Robert Megennis won the season's first race at St. Petersburg and was the only other driver to win a race. He finished sixth in points, as he did not finish on the podium again the rest of the season.

Drivers and teams

Race calendar and results

Championship standings

Drivers' Championship

Teams' Championship

References

External links 
 Official website

U.S. F2000 National Championship
U.S. F2000 National Championship